The Nyomda is a river in Kostroma Oblast and Ivanovo Oblast in Russia, a left tributary of the Volga. It flows into the Nyomda Bay of the Gorky Reservoir of the Volga River.

The Nyomda freezes up in November and remains icebound until mid-April. Its largest tributary is the Shuya.

References 

Rivers of Kostroma Oblast
Rivers of Ivanovo Oblast